The Fight with the Dragon is a 1935 German comedy film directed by Franz Seitz and starring Adele Sandrock, Joe Stöckel and Hans Schlenck.

It was made at the Bavaria Studios in Munich. The film's sets were designed by the art director Max Seefelder.

Synopsis
A countess stubbornly refuses to sell her three hundred year-old brewery to a rival.

Cast
 Adele Sandrock as Gräfin Drachenstein
 Joe Stöckel as Bachmeier
 Hans Schlenck as Fritz Carsten
 Lucie Englisch as Trude Carsten
 Gretl Theimer as Komtess Helene
 Walter Lantzsch as Carsten Sr.
 Josef Eichheim as Nickelmann
 Fritz Odemar as Bihold
 Theodor Autzinger as Stelzer
 Maria Byk as Wirtschafterin
 Justus Paris as Karl
 Karl Elzer as Spange

References

Bibliography

External links 
 

1935 films
Films of Nazi Germany
German comedy films
1935 comedy films
1930s German-language films
Films directed by Franz Seitz
Bavaria Film films
Films about beer
Films shot at Bavaria Studios
German black-and-white films
1930s German films